Rhaphidopsis zonaria is a species of beetle in the family Cerambycidae. It was described by James Thomson in 1857. It is known from South Africa.

References

Tragocephalini
Beetles described in 1857
Endemic beetles of South Africa